Baker Municipal Airport  is a public-use airport located one nautical mile (1.15 mi, 1.85 km) southeast of the central business district of Baker, a city in Fallon County, Montana, United States. The airport is owned by Baker City and Fallon County. It is included in the FAA's National Plan of Integrated Airport Systems for 2011–2015, which categorized it as a general aviation facility.

Although many U.S. airports use the same three-letter location identifier for the FAA and IATA, this facility is assigned BHK by the FAA but has no designation from the IATA (which assigned BHK to Bukhara Airport in Bukhara, Uzbekistan).

Facilities and aircraft 
It has one runway designated 13/31 with an asphalt surface measuring 4,898 by 75 feet (1,493 x 23 m).

For the 12-month period ending September 1, 2010, the airport had 7,050 aircraft operations, an average of 19 per day: 95% general aviation, 4% air taxi, and 1% military. At that time there were 23 aircraft based at this airport: 87% single-engine, 9% multi-engine and 4% helicopter.

References

External links 
 Baker Air Service, the fixed-base operator
 Aerial photo as of 22 August 1997 from USGS The National Map
 

Airports in Montana
Buildings and structures in Fallon County, Montana
Transportation in Fallon County, Montana